Crazy Pictures is a Swedish film collective based in Norrköping, founded in 2008. They first found success with a short films series on YouTube, and released their debut feature film The Unthinkable in 2018. Their second feature film, UFO Sweden, was released in 2022. They have also worked in TV adverts, music videos and TV production.

Filmography

Members 

 Albin Pettersson
 Olle Tholén
 Rasmus Råsmark
 Hannes Krantz
 Gustaf Spetz
 Victor Danell

References

External links 

 

Cinema of Sweden